Vladimir Savanović (born 12 June 1985) is a Serbian racewalker. He placed 42nd in the men's 50 kilometres walk at the 2016 Summer Olympics.

References

External links
 
 
 
 
  (archive)

1985 births
Living people
Serbian male racewalkers
Olympic athletes of Serbia
Athletes (track and field) at the 2016 Summer Olympics
21st-century Serbian people